Umunna is a surname. Notable people with the surname include:

Chuka Umunna, British politician
Glory Umunna, Nigerian beauty pageant winner